His full name was Gabriel de Lencastre Ponce de León Manrique de Lara Cádenas Girón y Aragon (1667–1745), known as Dom Gabriel of Lencastre.

He was the 2nd son of Manuel Ponce de León, 6th Duke of Los Arcos, in Spain, and Maria de Guadalupe of Lencastre, 6th Duchess of Aveiro.

His mother was recognised by the Portuguese King, as Duchess of Aveiro, in 1679, on the condition she would return to Portugal. Due to her husband's opposition, she divorced him, returned to her homeland and regained the House of Aveiro and their estates.

Their elder son, Don Joaquín, would inherited the Spanish House of the Dukes of Los Arcos, while the younger, Dom Gabriel, would inherited the Portuguese House of the Dukes of Aveiro.

Only after his mother's death (1715), he came to Portugal. While he lived in Spain, King Charles II granted him the title of Duke of Baños, and he served in the Spanish army, both in the Catalonia and in the Flanders campaigns.

He died single without issue.

After his death the Duchy was claimed by his nephew, António de Lencastre Ponce de León (son of Joaquin 7th Duke of Los Arcos), and by José de Mascarenhas, 8th Count of Santa Cruz and 5th Marquis of Gouveia (descending from Álvaro and Juliana of Lencastre through female line).

See also
Duke of Aveiro
Duke of Torres Novas
Marquis of Torres Novas

External links
 Genealogy of Gabriel of Lencastre, 7th Duke of Aveiro, in Portuguese

Bibliography
”Nobreza de Portugal e do Brasil" – Vol. II, pages 346. Published by Zairol Lda., Lisbon 1989.

107
Portuguese nobility
1667 births
1745 deaths